Point Pleasant Township is located in Warren County, Illinois, United States. As of the 2010 census, its population was 157 and it contained 67 housing units.

Geography

Demographics

References

External links
City-data.com
Illinois State Archives

Townships in Warren County, Illinois
Townships in Illinois